Frank Morey Coffin (July 11, 1919 – December 7, 2009) was an American politician from Maine and a United States circuit judge of the United States Court of Appeals for the First Circuit.

Education and career

Born on July 11, 1919, in Lewiston, Maine, Coffin received an Artium Baccalaureus degree in 1940 from Bates College. He completed graduate instruction in Industrial Administration in 1943 from Harvard Business School and a Bachelor of Laws in 1947 from Harvard Law School. He was a lieutenant in the United States Navy from 1943 to 1946. He was a law clerk for Judge John David Clifford Jr. of the United States District Court for the District of Maine from 1947 to 1949. He was corporation counsel for Lewiston from 1949 to 1952. He was in private practice in Lewiston from 1946 to 1953. He was in private practice in Portland, Maine from 1953 to 1956. He was a United States representative from Maine from 1957 to 1961. He was the Managing Director of the Development Loan Fund in 1961. He was the Deputy Administrator of the United States Agency for International Development from 1961 to 1964. He was United States Representative to the development assistance committee of the Organisation for Economic Co-Operation and Development from 1964 to 1965.

United States representative 

Coffin served as chairman of the Maine Democratic state committee from 1954 to 1956 and was elected as a Democrat to the United States House of Representatives in 1956. He was elected to the 85th and 86th Congresses, serving from January 3, 1957 until January 3, 1961. He did not seek re-election in the 1960 election, choosing instead to embark on an unsuccessful campaign for Governor of Maine.

Federal judicial service

Coffin was nominated by President Lyndon B. Johnson on September 15, 1965, to a seat on the United States Court of Appeals for the First Circuit vacated by Judge John Patrick Hartigan. He was confirmed by the United States Senate on October 1, 1965, and received his commission on October 2, 1965. He served as a board member of the Federal Judicial Center from 1971 to 1972. He was a member of the Judicial Conference of the United States from 1972 to 1983 He served as Chief Judge from 1972 to 1983. He assumed senior status on February 1, 1989. He took inactive senior status in the fall of 2006. His service terminated on December 7, 2009, due to his death.

Death

Coffin died on December 7, 2009 at Maine Medical Center in Portland from complications following surgery to repair an aortic aneurysm.

Publications

Coffin is the author of four books: Witness for AID (Houghton Mifflin 1964); The Ways of a Judge: Views from the Federal Appellate Bench (Houghton Mifflin 1980); A Lexicon of Oral Advocacy (National Institute of Trial Advocacy 1985); On Appeal: Courts, Lawyering and Judging (W.W. Norton 1994).

References

Sources
; retrieved February 6, 2008.

External links

1919 births
2009 deaths
Judges of the United States Court of Appeals for the First Circuit
United States court of appeals judges appointed by Lyndon B. Johnson
20th-century American judges
United States Navy personnel of World War II
United States Navy officers
American legal writers
American artists
Politicians from Lewiston, Maine
Politicians from South Portland, Maine
Military personnel from Maine
Harvard Business School alumni
Harvard Law School alumni
Bates College alumni
Democratic Party members of the United States House of Representatives from Maine
20th-century American politicians